North Devon Council in Devon, England is elected every four years. Since the last boundary changes in 2003, 43 councillors have been elected from 27 wards.

Political control
The first election to the council was held in 1973, initially operating as a shadow authority before coming into its powers on 1 April 1974. Political control of the council since 1973 has been held by the following parties:

Leadership
The leaders of the council since 2011 have been:

Council elections
1973 North Devon District Council election
1976 North Devon District Council election
1979 North Devon District Council election
1983 North Devon District Council election (New ward boundaries)
1987 North Devon District Council election
1991 North Devon District Council election
1995 North Devon District Council election
1999 North Devon District Council election
2003 North Devon District Council election (New ward boundaries reduced the number of seats by 1)
2007 North Devon District Council election (Some new ward boundaries)
2011 North Devon District Council election
2015 North Devon District Council election (New ward boundaries)
2019 North Devon District Council election

District result maps

By-election results

1995-1999

1999-2003

2003-2007

2007-2011

2011-2015

References

By-election results

External links
North Devon District Council

 
Council elections in Devon
North Devon
District council elections in England